Les Enfants terribles is a danced chamber opera for four voices and three pianos (grand pianos or electronic), composed in 1996 by Philip Glass, to a French-language libretto by the composer, in collaboration with the American choreographer Susan Marshall, after Jean Cocteau's eponymous novel published in 1929 and Jean-Pierre Melville's 1950 film. The world premiere of the work took place on 18 May 1996 in Zug conducted by Karen Kamensek.

Performance history
The work was performed in Albertslund, Denmark, on 28 and 29 May 1996 as part of  when Copenhagen was the European Capital of Culture.

The opera received its UK premiere on 20 August 2010 at the Arcola Theatre, directed by Andrea Ferran. It transferred to the Lilian Baylis Theatre. A second British production, choreographed be Javier de Frutos, with dancers from the Royal Ballet was staged at the Barbican Centre in 2017.

Roles

Synopsis 
After the death of their mother, Elizabeth and Paul, orphaned brother and sister left to their own devices and bound by an exclusive affection, live together in their large Parisian apartment.

They have built themselves a chimeric universe governed by sibylline symbols. Their room is a real sanctuary where a "treasure" is enthroned with a meaning that is also known only to them. "Elizabeth" met Michael and married him, but the next day he died in an accident without their marriage having been consummated.

She inherited Michael's fortune, including a large private mansion where Paul came to join her with their famous treasure. Gérard, a comrade of Paul and his friend Agathe, who strangely resembles Dargelos (a schoolboy that Paul idolized), soon come to live with them. But when Elizabeth understands that love is born between her brother and Agatha, like a Greek divinity, a kind of Parque, she weaves a Machiavellian web so that her brother cannot escape it. As in all ancient tragedies, the outcome can only be fatal.

Fascinating by the morbid desire carried by the Paul/Elisabeth relationship, this seemingly banal story hides a tragedy: the inevitable end of adolescence, its myths, its grace, its illusions. Elizabeth and Paul die for breaking this law by wanting to eternalize a moment of passage. Indeed, as soon as Dargelos' snowball reaches Paul in the chest, time stops, "the room" begins to live. It became their deserted island, the little piece of land isolated from the rest of the world where they built cabins with their pillows and led a Robinson's existence at night. Their bodies grow, Paul's legs protrude under his sheets, they play at having the desires of grown-ups; but in fact, nothing moves. If they move, it's to rebuild the room immediately. Behind their incessant quarrels, their constant agitation, there is a morbid desire for immobility...

It was Dargelos, the hidden god of this tragedy, who precipitated its outcome by sending a poisoned black ball to Paul, who completed the work of the first snowball. Elizabeth, priestess of the chamber, is only the instrument of fate. By killing herself and her brother, she brings their adolescence into eternity.

Structure 
Scenes:

1: Ouverture
2: Paul est mourant
3: Une boule de neige
4: Deux moitiés dans un même corps
5: Il n’a pas dit au revoir
6: Le somnambule
7: Elle m’a giflé
8a: Ils vivaient leur rêve
8b: Et puis laisser
9: Appelez-moi Elisabeth
11: Modèle entrecroisé
11a: Terrible Interlude
11: le Verdict
13: Interlude Musicale – le Retour chez Orphée
14a, b: Cocon de châles
15: Perdu
16: Il écrivit son propre nom
17: Es-tu amoureuse, Agathe?
18: De la part de Dargelos
19: Elle prit la route
20: La fin de Paul

Recordings 
 Christine Arand (soprano), Philip Cutlip (bass-baritone), Hal Cazalet (tenor), Valérie Komar (mezzo-soprano), Philip Glass, Nelson Padgett, Eleanor Sandresky (pianos) conducted by Karen Kamensek, recorded in December 1996 and January 1997. Orange Mountain Music (April 2005).

References

External links 
 
 Les Enfants terribles on the composer's site
 "Argument" on opéraonline
 Les Enfants terribles on the North Carolina Opera official website
 "Steps" Official site of the festival
 Press release for the premiere at the Opéra national de Bordeaux in November 2011 (in French, 15 pages)

1996 operas
French-language operas
Operas by Philip Glass
Operas based on novels
Operas
Adaptations of works by Jean Cocteau